Åke Helge Ortmark (14 May 1929 – 18 October 2018) was a Swedish journalist, author and radio and television presenter. During a long career he worked for both television and radio; he also authored several books.

Early life
Ortmark was born in Stockholm, and grew up in Ålsten.

During the early 1950s he studied economics at the University of California in the United States. Ortmark earned a Master of Science in Business and Economics at Handelshögskolan in Stockholm in 1954.

Career
Ortmark started working at Sveriges Radio in 1958. He was for some time a newsreader for Aktuellt which was broadcast on Sveriges Television. Together with Herbert Söderström, Ortmark pioneered the technique named "Skjutjärnsjournalistik" (hard-hitting journalism) in Swedish, on Sveriges Radio in 1962. As part of "De tre O:na", he became known for using the technique alongside Lars Orup and Gustaf Olivecrona in live broadcast on Sveriges Television in 1966 while interviewing Prime Minister Tage Erlander.

Ortmark became the editor-in-chief of the weekly newspaper Veckans Affärer between 1974 and 1976. In 1997 he was the television presenter for his own interview show O som i Ortmark which was broadcast on TV8 until 2006, by which time Ortmark decided to leave to work for Axess TV.

Ortmark received the television award Kristallen in 2005 in the category Stiftelsens hederspris (the Foundation's Honour Award) for his work in TV and dedication for news and discussions.

On 25 June 2006, Ortmark took part in Sommar i P1 talking about his career and life. In 2008, he was member of Humanisternas (the humanists) council.

In 2013, Ortmark published his memoirs called Makten och lögnen – ett liv i televisionens Sverige which told about his career in journalism.

Personal life
Åke Ortmark in 1961 married Sinikka Tenhunen. After his divorce, he married Annika Roth in 1974. Ortmark was the father of three children.

Ortmark had a black belt in karate.

Ortmark died on 18 October 2018 after a short time of illness at the age of 89.

Bibliography
1963 – Sveket mot konsumenterna
1967 – Maktspelet i Sverige
1969 – De okända makthavarna
1971 – Maktens redskap, 
1972 – Den inre cirkeln, 
1977 – Lamco!, 
1981 – Skuld och makt, 
1985 – Maktens människor, 
1996 – Ja-sägarna, 
2013 – Makten och lögnen: ett liv i televisionens Sverige,

Filmography
1973 – Makt på spel (TV series)

References

External links 

1929 births
2018 deaths
20th-century Swedish writers
Stockholm School of Economics alumni
Swedish journalists
Swedish memoirists
Swedish newspaper editors
Swedish radio presenters
Swedish television hosts
University of California alumni
Writers from Stockholm